La Salle Institute is an independent, private, Catholic college preparatory school run by the Institute of the Brothers of the Christian Schools in Troy, New York, United States serving boys and girls in grades six through twelve. It was established by the De La Salle Brothers in 1850 and located within but operates independently of the Diocese of Albany.

History 
La Salle Institute was founded in 1850 and was originally located in downtown Troy.  The school was first charted by the New York State Board of Regents in 1891.  In the 1960s a modern facility was constructed on Williams Road near the boundary between the city of Troy and the town of North Greenbush. The new campus opened in January 1966. Grades 7 and 8 were added in 1971 and Grade 6 was added in 1991.  A substantial renovation and expansion was completed in 1990, 1999 and 2001. 

In September 2021, La Salle Institute became a co-educational institution after 171 years of education all-boys. As of the 2021-22 school year, La Salle Institute educated 428 students including 65 girls and 363 boys.

Historical Enrollment

Notable alumni 
The following is an incomplete list of notable La Salle Institute alumni:
 Joseph J. Bulmer, Nuclear engineer 
 William L. Carley (1930), Mayor of Troy, NY from 1984 to 1985.
 Robert D. Carlson, Mayor of Watervliet, New York from 1996 until 2007.
 Pat M. Casale, New York State Assemblyman for the 108th Assembly District from 1992 until 2006.
 Peter J. Cayan (1947), President of SUNY Institute of Technology from 1982 until 2002; the school's library now bears his name.   Currently he is a member of La Salle's Board of Trustees.
 Robert T. Coonrod (1962), President and CEO of the Corporation for Public Broadcasting (CPB) from 1997 to 2005.
 James V. Coffey (1896): Appointed as a Justice for the New York State Supreme Court in 1925.
 Bishop Howard J. Hubbard (1956): Bishop of the Roman Catholic Diocese of Albany from 1977 to 2014.
 Guy Hebert: Hockey goalie, played for 10 years in the National Hockey League and Team USA, including the 1997 NHL All-Star Game.
 William J. Larkin Jr. (1944): member of the New York State Legislature from 1979 to 2018 
 Bishop Elias Manning (1956): Bishop of Valença, Brazil.
 Michael R. McNulty: Member of the United States House of Representatives from 1989 to 2009. Represented the 21st Congressional District of New York.
 Martin E. Sullivan, Director of the National Portrait Gallery of the Smithsonian Institution.  Former Director of the New York State Museum.
 Reid Scott, actor
 Scott Sicko (2005), former NFL Tight-end for the Dallas Cowboys.
 Larry Sheffield (1961), Notre Dame basketball player
 Sean Dewey (2014), drafted 32nd round for the Cardinals
 Rev. William F. X. Sullivan, S.J. (1892), Jesuit Priest for 54 years - 7/30/1909- 5/22/1964, Taught at Georgetown University, Loyola College Baltimore, St. Joseph's College Philadelphia, Boston College, Holy Cross College, St. Francis Xavier New York City.

See also 
 List of Catholic schools in New York

References

External links 
 

Lasallian schools in the United States
Private schools in Capital District (New York)
Catholic secondary schools in New York (state)
Boys' schools in New York (state)
Roman Catholic Diocese of Albany
Schools in Rensselaer County, New York
Private middle schools in New York (state)
Educational institutions established in 1850
1850 establishments in New York (state)